Temple Emanu-El-Beth Sholom, Westmount is a Reform synagogue in Westmount, Quebec.  It is the  oldest “Liberal” or
“Reform” synagogue in Canada, incorporated on March 30, 1883 (the Bill of the incorporation was granted under the Act of Incorporation (46 Victoria 1883) by the Quebec Provincial Legislature), and is the only Reform congregation in Quebec.

History
The founding meeting for the Reform congregation, later to be known as Temple Emanuel, was held on August 23, 1882,  in Lindsay Hall, St. Catherine Street West. The attendees included the leading trustees of the English, German and Polish Congregation (known then as the St. Constant Street Synagogue, now known as the Shaar Hashomayim Synagogue) and  the Portuguese Congregation – Shearith Israel (now known as Spanish and Portuguese Synagogue of Montreal) (Both congregations were the only ones in Montreal at the time and were Orthodox).

The May 2, 1884 issue of  Hamelitz, a Russian newspaper printed in Hebrew, record of events that lead up to the breakaway of members who would create "Temple Emanuel".

Rabbi Samuel Marks became the congregation's first Minister, lecturer and teacher. He came from the United States bringing with him the “new ideas of Reform”.

The first services of Temple were held in Albert Hall, of the Zion Church, at the foot of Beaver Hall Hill Street at Latour Street.

The First Temple Sanctuary was erected on Cyprus Street at Stanley Street in 1892.

In September, 1911, Temple Emanu-El's new building, at the corner of Elm and Sherbrooke streets in Westmount, was dedicated. The Temple Emanu-el was enlarged in 1922. The building, which was destroyed by fire, featured a cruciform plan and Romanesque detailing resembling a church. The building included facilities for education, social gatherings and auxiliary groups, and an auditoriumlike sanctuary with mixed seating.  It was one of the first Canadian congregations based on the Reform service.

In 1980, Temple Beth Sholom, a sister congregation formed in 1953, was united with Emanu-El, to form the present Temple Emanu-El-Beth Sholom congregation.

The building
The new building, which had been built in 1911 in Westmount on land donated by Sir Mortimer Davis, was expanded significantly to the west in 1941 to add an additional all purpose hall and school facilities. The architecture was similar to that of the original building. The next expansion, called "Greater Emanu-EI",  doubled the size of the sanctuary among other features. It was built to the east of the original sanctuary and the Temple now occupied the entire block between Wood and Elm avenues. It was a modern style of architecture and shortly after its dedication in 1957, in December of that year, the original 1911 building burned to the ground. Reconstruction began immediately, and the new Temple Emanu-El building was completed, also in modern architecture, in 1959.

The original building was in the Byzantine Revival style, with seating accommodations for 700, and provision for more when the membership warranted it. It was built at a cost of $65.000.

On Friday, April 22, 1960, the new building and its sanctuary were dedicated at a service, conducted by Dr. Harry J- Stern, leader of the congregation.

Features
Aron Museum: Part of the Maurice Pollack Cultural Centre, the Aron Museum is Canada's first museum, founded in 1953, of Jewish ceremonial art objects. The pieces that form the Aron Museum's collection come from around the world, like a silver Hanukah menorah from Uzbekistan, and reveal both the diversity and continuity of Judaism across time and space.

Activities
The committee of docents offers educational guided tours for groups of students from area high schools, colleges, universities, and adult study groups.

In conjunction with the Cummings Jewish Centre for Seniors, Temple Emanu-El offers, as the Westmount Mini Centre, a variety of courses and social programs.

Affiliations
Union for Reform Judaism
Canadian Association of Reform Zionists

Cemeteries
Temple Emanuel-Beth Sholom offers cemetery services in four locations 
Mount Royal Cemetery, on the Outremont side of Mount Royal
Eternal Gardens Cemetery, in Montreal's West Island Suburb of Beaconsfield
Lakeview Memorial Gardens, in Montreal's West Island, adjacent to Eternal Gardens Cemetery
Kehal Israel Memorial Cemetery, in the West Island suburb of Dollard-des-Ormeaux

Rabbis
Rabbi Samuel Marks: September 1882 - 1889 (Temple Emanu-El)
Rabbi S. Eisenberg: 1889 - 1890 (Temple Emanu-El)
Rabbi Abraham Myer Polack: 1890 - 1891 (Temple Emanu-El)
Rabbi A. N. Bloch: 1890 - 1891
Rabbi Hartog Veld: 1890 - 1899  (Temple Emanu-El)
Rabbi Elias Friedlander: 1899 - 1901  (Temple Emanu-El)
Rabbi Isaac Landman: 1901 - 1904 Temple Emanu-El)
Rabbi Joseph E. Kornfeld: 1904 - 1906 (Temple Emanu-El)
Rabbi Nathan Gordon: 1906 - 1927 (Temple Emanu-El)
Rabbi Samuel Schwartz: 1917 - 1919 (Temple Emanu-El)
Rabbi Julius H. Halprin:  1920 (Temple Emanu-El)
Rabbi Max Merritt: 1921 - 1925 (Temple Emanu-El)
Rabbi Herbert J Samuel: 1926 (Temple Emanu-El)
Rabbi Harold (Harry) Joshua Stern: 1927 - 1979  (Temple Emanu-El)
Rabbi H. Leonard Poller: 1954 - 1961 (Temple Beth Sholom)
Rabbi Paul Liner: 1962 - 1972 (Temple Beth Sholom)
Rabbi Mark Golub: 1972 - 1979 (Temple Beth Sholom)
Rabbi David Powell: 1979 - 1980 (Temple Beth Sholom)
Rabbi Bernard Bloomstone: 1972 - 1983 (Temple Emanu-El-Beth Sholom)
Rabbi Louis Cashdan: 1984 (Temple Emanu-El-Beth Sholom)
Rabbi Kenneth Segal: 1984 - 1987 (Temple Emanu-El-Beth Sholom)
Rabbi Saul Besser: 1987-1988
Interim rabbis 1988-1989
Rabbi Leigh Lerner: March 1989– 2012 (Temple Emanu-El-Beth Sholom)
Rabbi Leigh Lerner, Rabbi Emeritus: 2012- 
Rabbi Lisa Grushcow, 2012-

Musical leadership
Director of Music and Cantorial Soloist: Rachelle Shubert 2001–Present (Temple Emanu-El-Beth Sholom)

Notable members
Mortimer Davis
Victor Goldbloom
Hermann Gruenwald, Holocaust survivor, and author of "After Auschwitz: One Man's Story"
Alfred Zion, founder of Dominion Lock Company Limited

References

External links

https://web.archive.org/web/20070506201245/http://data.urj.org/conglist/detail.cfm?id=C358
https://web.archive.org/web/20110724120041/http://cd005.urj.net/

http://www.rachelleshubert.com

Synagogues in Montreal
Reform synagogues in Canada
Buildings and structures in Westmount, Quebec
1960 establishments in Quebec
Synagogues completed in 1960
Byzantine Revival synagogues